Anselmo "El Chemiro" Martínez is a popular Tejano singer, songwriter and musician. He gained prominence in the mid-1960s by recording orchestra music influenced by Glenn Miller, and by subsequently introducing the style coast to coast as he was touring and recording his original compositions. He has released 13 albums, 248 original songs and over 200 popular song recordings. Martínez in his 80s still performs and has written 261 Gospel songs releasing 5 gospel CDs. He is the President of The Guadalupanos at St. Gabriel’s Church. Anselmo “El Chemiro” Martínez, is an inductee to the TTMA Tejano Hall of Fame.

Career
Currently, Anselmo "El Chemiro" Martínez is promoting his latest release Admirando A mi padre under AMI Music Group in San Antonio, Texas. Martínez latest Recording is a Father and Son release with producer and label CEO Jonny Martinez. This CD is predominantly a blast from the brilliant past of Anselmo's career by re-recording Caminos Chuecos and some of his major hits along with the orchestra style of the 1950s that Martínez recorded. As an 88 year old artist Martínez has been able to be included in the Tejano Legends Cruise and will perform on Carnival Cruise Lines in January 2016 in support of promoting this latest album.

In 1949, he began with a small Conjunto called Conjunto Gauna and debut their performance on KVOU radio in Uvalde, Texas. He slowly began climbing the charts with his biggest original hit "Caminos Chuecos" on 45rpm record with the flip side a recording called "Nadie Nos Separara". Born in Dunlay, Texas and raised in the Central part of Texas, comes a living legend in his own rite in which he follows in his father Jesus Martínez' footsteps, originally from Morelos, Coahuila, Mexico.

Anselmo Martínez was in the late 1960s at the pinnacle of his career with an orchestrated sound of trumpets and saxophones combined with his own original style. Inspired by the Glenn Miller Band during his younger years, Martínez incorporated his written arrangements to accompany more than 250 Spanish compositions of his own. Traveling the United States from Coast to Coast for more than 15 years, Anselmo Martínez has performed extensively in 40 states.

Discography
Albums in order from newest to oldest

Admirando A Mi Padre
 Caminos Chuecos
 Un Raton
 Hasta Que Llegaste
 El Paraiso
 Amorcito Consentido
 No Olvides Que te quiero
 Mi Nombre Completo
 Jamaican me Crazy
 Anoche
 Te Quiero Dar Mi Amor
 Mi Ranchito
 Los Laureles

Caminos Chuecos
 Caminos Chuecos
 Carino Santo
 Un Amor que se quiere
 LLoro Por ti
 Nuestros Besos
 Nadie Nos Separara
 I'm in the mood for love
 El Mar el la esperanza
 Besame
 Te Vi La Prueba
 No Me sigas enganado

Se Vale La Pena
 No Quiero Seguir Sufriendo
 Que Bonito
 Ahora Que Tengo Dinero
 La Yegua Ajena
 Volver Volver
 Hay Unos Ojos
 Tu Tienes La Culpa
 Me Toco Perder
 Cuenta Aparte
 Dile
 Mal Pasado De Amor
 Hasta El Fin
 Quedo Triste Y Abandonado
 Leyenda Macabra
 Tristes Corazones
 Me Cambio Por El Dinero
 Aunque Estes Tan Lejos

El Chemiro
 Te Quiero Te Extraño
 Dueña De Mi Corazon
 Prison De Botellas
 El Panadero
 Me Agarro Contigo
 Sirveme Otra Cantinero
 Rosalva De Leon
 Perdoname
 Morena De Mi Vida
 Pobre Desdichado
 Tu Retrato
 Entre Botellas De Vino
 Por Tu Culpa
 Corrido
 Me Ha Robado El Corazon
 Harto

El Trovador Tejano
 La Cruz De Vidrio
 La Condena
 Esta Noche Me Encuentro Borracho
 El Indio
 Maldita Suerte
 El Bilongo
 Mi Cielo Gris
 Mi Ultimo Trago
 Llore Llore
 Voy A Navegar
 Lleno De Recuerdos
 Prefiero Morir
 Copa Tras Copa
 La Ultima Botella
 La Novedad

Honors

 Tejano Music Awards (1984) - "Inducted into Hall of Fame"
 Radio Latin Charts (1964) - "Single of the Year" for "Caminos Chuecos"
 Tejano Music Hall of Fame (1987)
 Texas Musicians Museum Hall of Fame(2010)
 Austin Museum of Arts(2011)
 Gold Album Award for Lifetime Achievement (2012)

References
Burr, Ramiro (1999). "Anselmo Martinez". In The Billboard Guide to Tejano and Regional Mexican Music''. Paul Kingsbury, Editor. New York's Billboard Books,. pp. 64.

External links
 
 

Latin Grammy Award winners
Living people
Tejano musicians
Year of birth missing (living people)
Place of birth missing (living people)